Aleksander Tammert (born 2 February 1973) is an Estonian discus thrower.

Athletics career
Tammert competed at the 2004 Olympics and originally finishing fourth, but as gold medal winner Róbert Fazekas was disqualified, Tammert received the bronze medal. A month later he placed third at the World Athletics Final.

In 2005 Tammert placed fourth at both the World Championships and the World Athletics Final. Fellow Estonian Gerd Kanter won silver medals at both these events.

In 2006 he placed third at both the European Championships and the World Athletics Final. Kanter again won silver medals at both these events.

His personal best throw is 70.82m (232'3½"), set on 15 April 2006 in Denton, Texas.

Achievements

Personal
Aleksander Tammert is married to Slovenian javelin thrower Elizabeta Randjelovič Tammert with whom he has two daughters.

His father, Aleksander Tammert Sr. (28 April 1947 – 27 October 2006), was a retired shot putter and athletics coach. He won the European Junior Championships in 1966.

Aleksander Tammert is a SMU Mustangs class of 1996.

References

External links

 
 
 
 
 

1973 births
Living people
Sportspeople from Tartu
Estonian male discus throwers
Athletes (track and field) at the 1996 Summer Olympics
Athletes (track and field) at the 2000 Summer Olympics
Athletes (track and field) at the 2004 Summer Olympics
Athletes (track and field) at the 2008 Summer Olympics
Athletes (track and field) at the 2012 Summer Olympics
Olympic athletes of Estonia
Olympic bronze medalists for Estonia
SMU Mustangs men's track and field athletes
European Athletics Championships medalists
Medalists at the 2004 Summer Olympics
Olympic bronze medalists in athletics (track and field)
Universiade medalists in athletics (track and field)
World Athletics Championships athletes for Estonia
Universiade gold medalists for Estonia
Estonian expatriate sportspeople in the United States
Medalists at the 2001 Summer Universiade